Carreño can refer to:

People
 Amalio Carreño (b. 1964), Venezuelan baseball player
 Ángel Carreño (b. 1980), Chilean footballer
 Angelina Carreño (b. 1981), Mexican politician
 Ariel Carreño (b. 1979), Argentine footballer
 Carlos Carreño (b. 1973), Spanish volleyball player
 Darío Carreño (b. 1988), Mexican footballer
 Enrique Carreño (b. 1986), Spanish footballer
 Fernando Carreño (b. 1979), Italian-Uruguayan footballer
 Inocente Carreño (1919–2016), Venezuelan composer
 Jaime Carreño (b. 1997), Chilean footballer
 Joel Carreño (b. 1987), Dominican baseball player
 José Carreño (b. 1947), Ecuadorian painter
 José Daniel Carreño (b. 1963), Uruguayan football manager
 José Luis Carreño (1905-1986), Spanish Catholic missionary
 José Manuel Carreño (b. 1968), Cuban-American ballet dancer
 José María Carreño (1792-1840), Venezuelan politician and military
 José Suárez Carreño (1915-2002), Spanish-Mexican writer
 Juan Carreño Lara (1909-1940), Mexican footballer
 Juan Carreño López (b. 1968), Chilean footballer
 Juan Carreño de Miranda (1614–1685), Spanish painter
 Luis Carreño, Spanish-language voice actor
 Manuel Antonio Carreño (1812–1864), Venezuelan musician and diplomat
 Mario Carreño y Morales (1913-1999), Cuban painter
 Pablo Carreño Busta (b. 1991), Spanish tennis player
 Rafael Ramírez Carreño (b. 1963), Venezuelan engineer and politician
 Teresa Carreño (1853-1917), Venezuelan pianist, singer, composer, and conductor
 Víctor A. Carreño (b. 1956), Dominican NASA Aerospace Engineer and Aerospace Technologist

Places
 Carreño, a city in Spain
 Puerto Carreño, capital of Vichada, Colombia